Lulling may refer to:

 Astrid Lulling (born 1929), politician in Luxembourg and Member of the European Parliament
 Jérôme Lulling, a linguist in Luxembourg

See also
 Lull (disambiguation)
 Lullington (disambiguation)

German-language surnames